John Stikelane was an English politician who was MP for Lyme Regis in 1394.

References

English MPs 1394
Members of the Parliament of England (pre-1707) for Lyme Regis
14th-century births